NGC 6115 is an open cluster in the constellation Norma. It is located 2 degrees southeast of Gamma Normae. It is 3175 light-years distant and thought to be around 870 million years old.

References

NGC 6115
6115
Norma (constellation)